The European Theatre Convention (ETC) is a European theatre association founded in 1988.

The ETC is funded partly by the Creative Europe programme of its strategic partner, the European Commission. It is based in Berlin. As a "network of public theatres in Europe", it has 44 member theatres in 25 European countries. The ETC organizes projects which promote European theatre as a "platform for dialogue, democracy and interaction", and offers the possibility of international networking for theatre professionals. The executive director is Heidi Wiley.

History
, Jean-Claude Drouot and  founded the ETC in 1988. The statutes were laid down in November 1987. Initially three theatres in France, Belgium and Germany collaborated.

It aims at promoting contemporary theatrical creation, supporting the mobility of emerging artists, and the exchange of activities, ideas and artistic concepts in Europe.

Projects
The ETC has organised annual conferences on a variety of topics for theatre professionals, and has provided financial and organizational support for international artistic exchange. It has hosted a range of programmes.

"ENGAGE – Empowering today's audience through challenging theatre" was a four-year programme from 2017 to 2021, focused on the topics of participatory theatre, youth theatre and theatre in the digital age.

"Theatre is Dialogue – Dialogue of Cultures" is a program that has supported theatre makers in the Ukraine and other Eastern European countries since 2014. The focus is on the exchange of the theatre makers, such as artist residencies, guest performances and getting to know each other in the theatre scene.

Young Europe is a project of artistic cooperation, in which ETC member theatres have staged new theatre texts on the subjects of identity and integration, aiming at a young international audience. In 2015, Young Europe was recognized as a "European Success Story" by the EU.

European Theatre Lab: Drama goes Digital was a project, between 2016 and 2018, to researched the future of theatre in the digital age. It won the Pearle award "Spotlight on Heritage in Culture and the Arts".

The Art of Ageing was a project highlighting in four productions the challenges of a demographically changing society.

Renaissance was a 2021 programme which produced an original series of 22 short drama films.

Trans-Formations is a project to energize and revive European theatres and audiences in a post-COVID world. The activities include conferences, artistic programmes and workshops from 2021 to 2024.

Member theatres
:
 Albania: National Theatre of Albania (Tirana)
 Austria: Landestheater Linz, Volkstheater Wien (Vienna)
 Belgium: Théâtre de Liège
 Bulgaria: Theatre and Music Center Kardjali (Kardjali)
 Czech Republic: Národní divadlo/National Theatre (Prague)
 Croatia: Croatian National Theater (Zagreb)
 Cyprus: Theatrical Organization of Cyprus (Cyprus)
 France:  (Nancy), La Mousson d'Été (Pont-à-Mousson)
 Georgia: Kote Marjanishvili State Drama Theatre (Tbilisi), Lepl Kutaisi Lado Meskhishvili Professional State Drama Theater (Kutaisi)
 Germany: Deutsches Theater (Berlin), Staatstheater Braunschweig, Staatsschauspiel Dresden, Theater Dortmund, Theater & Orchester Heidelberg, Badisches Staatstheater Karlsruhe, Theater Magdeburg
 Hungary: Pesti Magyar Színház (Budapest),  (Szombathely)
 Italy:  (Turin), Fondazione  (Parma),  (Lecce)
 Luxembourg: Théâtre d'Esch (Esch-sur-Alzette), Grand Théâtre de Luxembourg (Luxembourg City)
 Malta: Teatru Malta (Valletta)
 Netherlands:  (Amsterdam)
 Norway: Det Norske Teatret (Oslo)
 Poland: JK Opole Theatre
 Portugal: Teatro Nacional D. Maria II (Lisbon), Teatro Municipal Sá de Miranda (Viana do Castelo)
 Romania: Teatrul National Marin Sorescu (Craiova), Teatrul National Timisoara, "Alexandru Davila" Theatre (Piteşti)
 Serbia: National Theatre in Belgrade
 Slovakia: Slovak National Theatre (Bratislava)
 Slovenia: , 
 Sweden: Göteborgs Stadsteater – Backa Teater (Gothenburg)
 Tunesia: Théâtre de l'Opéra de Tunis
 Ukraine: Kyiv National Academic Molodyy Theatre (Kyiv), Dakh Contemporary Arts Center (Kyiv), TEO Theatrical Space (Odessa)
 United Kingdom: Belarus Free Theatre (London)

References

External links
 
 

1988 establishments in Europe
Organizations established in 1988
Cultural organizations based in Europe
Theatrical organizations